Ricky Wells (born 27 July 1991 in Auckland, New Zealand), is an American international motorcycle speedway rider who rides for the Glasgow Tigers in the SGB Championship. He was the 2009 USA National Champion. He is also a two time U.S. Under 21 National Champion.
He has been an international rider for the USA in the old Speedway World Cup.

US National Championship 
On 19 September 2009 Ricky won the United States Individual Speedway Championship, winning all of his heat races and the main event. He became the youngest rider to ever win that event. He was victorious over former US Champions like, Billy Janniro, Bobby Schwartz, Charlie Venegas, Chris Manchester, Mike Faria and Josh Larsen.

World U21 
Wells made his first appearance in the World Under 21 Championships in 2008 by winning the 2007 U.S. Under 21 National Championship. He scored 9 points in Qualifying Round 1 held in Norden, Germany which qualified him to move onto Semi-Final Round 1 held in Rye House. Only scoring 6 points which did not qualify him to move onto The Final Round.

Wells came home and won the 2008 U.S. Under 21 National Championship also which placed him in the 2009 World Under 21 Championships. Scoring 9, and beating off Pawel Zmarzlik and Kozza Smith in a race-off, in Qualifying Round 3 held in Rye House moved him into Semi-Final 2 held in Kumla. In Kumla, Ricky scored 5 and again was in a race-off situation, in which he beat Justin Sedgmen and Patrik Pawlaszczyk to securing a reserve spot in the Final held in Goričan. Through the injury off Przemyslaw Pawlicki, Wells was awarded a place in the main line-up of the Final, where he scored 2 points, finishing in 16th place, ahead of Ludvig Lindgren.

British speedway
Wells rode for Elite League Coventry Bees in 2009 and for the Stoke Potters in the Premier League in 2010 on loan from Coventry. In 2011 he rode for the Elite Shield-winning Wolverhampton Wolves team in the Elite League and Plymouth Devils in the Premier. He has remained with Wolves since, while riding for Sheffield Tigers in the Premier League since 2012.

In 2022, he rode for the Berwick Bandits in the SGB Championship 2022.

Honours

World Championships 
 Team World Championship (Speedway World Cup)
 2009 - 4th place in the Qualifying Round 2
 Individual Under-21 World Championship
 2008 - 12th placed in the Semi-Final One
 2009 -  Goričan - 16th place (2 pts)

References 

1991 births
Living people
American speedway riders
New Zealand expatriates in the United States
Coventry Bees riders
Stoke Potters riders
Plymouth Devils riders
Sheffield Tigers riders
Wolverhampton Wolves riders